KSOI (91.9 MHz) is a community radio station broadcasting from Murray, Iowa to southern Iowa.  The 91.1 KW signal primarily serves Clarke, Union, Ringgold, Decatur, Taylor, Madison, Adair, Warren, Lucas, Adams, Wayne, and Polk counties with a variety of music and local features.

The KSOI license is held by Grand River Valley Radio, Inc., a non-profit with 501(c)3 status founded to explore the potential of building a community radio station to serve Southern Iowa.

Joe Hynek founded, designed, and built the non-profit educational station earning a construction permit.

KSOI studios operate from a room in the Murray Mansion located at 1002 Maple Street, Murray, IA.

See also
List of community radio stations in the United States

References

External links
KSOIFM.com
 

SOI (FM)
Community radio stations in the United States
Radio stations established in 2013
2013 establishments in Iowa